The 2011 FIM Nice Italian Speedway Grand Prix was the sixth race of the 2011 Speedway Grand Prix season. It took place on July 30 at the Pista Olimpia Terenzano stadium in Terenzano, Italy.

Riders 
The Speedway Grand Prix Commission nominated Matej Žagar as Wild Card, and Mattia Carpanese and Guglielmo Franchetti both as Track Reserves. Injury Artem Laguta was replaced by first Qualified Substitutes, Magnus Zetterström. The Draw was made on July 29 at 13:00 CEST.
 (13)  Artem Laguta → (19)  Magnus Zetterström

Results 
The Grand Prix was won by Andreas Jonsson, who beat World Championship leader Greg Hancock, Antonio Lindbäck and Kenneth Bjerre in the final.

Heat details

Heat after heat 
 (74,56) Žagar, Zetterström, Sayfutdinov, Bjerre
 (73,38) Kołodziej, Holder, Hancock, Gollob
 (73,31) Hampel, Lindbäck, Harris, Pedersen
 (73,31) Jonsson, Lindgren, Holta, Crump
 (72,60) Lindbäck, Jonsson, Kołodziej, Zetterström
 (72,25) Hampel, Bjerre, Gollob, Lindgren
 (72,57) Harris, Sayfutdinov, Holta, Hancock
 (74,06) Žagar, Holder, Pedersen, Crump
 (72,81) Crump, Gollob, Harris, Zetterström
 (73,00) Bjerre, Kołodziej, Pedersen, Holta
 (73,41) Sayfutdinov, Holder, Lindbäck, Lindgren (R4)
 (73,88) Hancock, Hampel, Jonsson, Žagar
 (73,43) Hancock, Lindgren, Pedersen, Zetterström
 (73,28) Bjerre, Jonsson, Harris, Holder
 (74,00) Crump, Kołodziej, Sayfutdinov, Hampel
 (74,66) Lindbäck, Žagar, Holta, Gollob
 (74,53) Hampel, Holta, Zetterström, Holder
 (74,75) Lindbäck, Bjerre, Hancock, Crump
 (75,22) Sayfutdinov, Gollob, Jonsson, Pedersen
 (75,12) Lindgren, Kołodziej, Žagar, Harris
 Semi-Finals:
 (74,35) Lindbaeck, Jonsson, Sayfutdinov, Žagar
 (74,81) Hancock, Bjerre, Hampel, Kołodziej
 the Final:
 (75,44) Jonsson (6 points), Hancock (4), Lindbaeck (2), Bjerre (0)

The intermediate classification

References

See also 
 motorcycle speedway

Speedway Grand Prix of Italy
Italy
2011